Manfred Petz (born 5 May 1961 in Mainz) is a German former goalkeeper. Since 2011 he has been working at Eintracht Frankfurt, first as goalkeeper coach and later as scout.

References

External links
 
 

1961 births
Sportspeople from Mainz
German footballers
1. FSV Mainz 05 players
SV Wehen Wiesbaden players
Eintracht Frankfurt non-playing staff
Living people
Association football goalkeepers
German footballers needing infoboxes
Footballers from Rhineland-Palatinate